Martin Pavlov Mintchev (Martin P. Mintchev, in Bulgarian Мартин П. Минчев) is a Bulgarian engineer and experimental surgeon.

He is currently Professor, Chair of Engineering, and Director of the Engineering Laboratory at Howard Payne University in Texas, United States, as well as Adjunct Professor of Experimental Surgery at the University of Alberta in Edmonton, Canada.

Martin Mintchev graduated from the Technical University of Sofia in 1987 with a specialization in Medical and Nuclear Electronics. In 1994, he defended his doctorate in Electrical Engineering at the University of Alberta, Canada under the supervision of Prof. Jack Kingma (Y. Jack Kingma). In the same year, he trained in experimental surgery at the Surgical Medical Research Institute in Edmonton, Canada under the supervision of Prof. Kenneth L. Bowes, and in 2001 (at the age of 38) became a full tenured professor at the University of Calgary, where he is currently Professor Emeritus.

He is the author of hundreds of articles in leading international scientific journals and conferences, and of dozens of patented inventions in the fields of biomedicine, electronics, intelligent microsystems, inertial navigation, software engineering, and Internet of Things. His scientific publications are widely cited by the international scientific community (Hirsch index > 30, and over 3000 external citations). He is the creator of the concepts of Enhanced Electrogastrography, Controlled Pseudobezoar technology for the treatment of obesity, Leakless Pipes, Microanimal Farming, Wearable Antiviral Garments, and other technological innovations.

in 2007, for particularly significant contributions to the development of biomedical instruments, Martin P. Mintchev was elected Fellow of the American Institute for Medical and Biological Engineering, Washington, DC, United States. He is a Senior Member of IEEE, member of the American Gastroenterological Association, Distinguished Lecturer of IEEE (2010-2011), and a registered Professional engineer (APEGA). He was a member of the Scientific Grants Evaluation Committees of the National Science Foundation (United States) and the Natural Sciences and Engineering Research Council (Canada).

Professor Mintchev has been interviewed by some of the biggest TV and radio stations in the world such as CTV, CBC, Yahoo News, Associated Press, KTAB-TV and more. Articles about his scientific developments have been published in many newspapers and magazines around the world, incl. Los Angeles Times, Chicago Tribune, Investing News Network, TechCrunch, Smithsonian Magazine, Huffington Post, etc. He has been a guest speaker at many universities and scientific forums across the globe.

References 

Bulgarian engineers
Year of birth missing (living people)
Living people
Bulgarian surgeons
21st-century American engineers
American surgeons
Bulgarian expatriates in the United States
American nuclear engineers
Senior Members of the IEEE